The following are the Phenomenal Box Office Star Awards given by the Box Office Entertainment Awards.

Box Office Entertainment Award for Phenomenal Box Office Star

 

The Box Office Entertainment Award for Phenomenal Box Office Star is the highest-acclaimed award presented annually by the Memorial Scholarship Foundation, led by Corazon Samaniego. It was first awarded at the 43rd Box Office Entertainment Awards ceremony, held in 2012; Vice Ganda first received the award for his work The Unkabogable Praybeyt Benjamin which grossed PHP 332,000,000.00 and was the highest grossing Filipino film of year 2011.

The first title holder of this award, Vice Ganda, retains his reign up to now by receiving the award for 8 consecutive years.

Multiple awards for Phenomenal Box Office Star
The following is a list of actors/actresses who received more than one Phenomenal Box Office Star Award.

Box Office Entertainment Award for Phenomenal Box Office Tandem
The Box Office Entertainment Award for Phenomenal Box Office Tandem is an award presented by the Memorial Scholarship Foundation, led by Corazon Samaniego. It was first awarded at the 45th Box Office Entertainment Awards ceremony, held in 2012; actors Vic Sotto & Ai Ai delas Alas first received the award for their work Enteng ng Ina Mo.

Box Office Entertainment Award for Phenomenal Box Office Child Star

The Box Office Entertainment Award for Phenomenal Box Office Child Star is an award presented by the Memorial Scholarship Foundation, led by Corazon Samaniego. It was first awarded at the 45th Box Office Entertainment Awards ceremony, held in 2014; Bimby Aquino Yap & Ryzza Mae Dizon first received the award for their work My Little Bossings which grossed PHP 401,000,000.00 and was the 2nd highest grossing Filipino film of year 2013.

References

Film awards for lead actress
Film awards for lead actor
Box Office Entertainment Awards